Dar Ab (also Romanized as Dar Āb; also known as Dar Āb-e Shengūn) is a village in Javar Rural District, in the Central District of Kuhbanan County, Kerman Province, Iran. At the 2006 census, its population was 24, in 5 families.

References 

Populated places in Kuhbanan County